Boraî Ahmed El Bashir (1932 – April 6, 2012) was a Sudanese footballer who played especially with Al-Merreikh SC. He scored the first Sudanese goal in the first Africa Cup of Nations in 1957 in Sudan.

Honours

With clubs
Winner of the Sudan Cup in 1964 with Al-Merreikh SC

National
Runner-up in the 1959 African Cup of Nations
Third place in the 1957 African Cup of Nations

References

External links
 Player profile – footballzz.com

1932 births
2012 deaths
Sudanese footballers
Sudan international footballers
1957 African Cup of Nations players
1959 African Cup of Nations players
Association football defenders
Al-Hilal Club (Omdurman) players
People from Omdurman
Al-Merrikh SC players